The 31st Señorita México pageant, was held at the Hipodromo Agua Caliente, Tijuana, Baja California, Mexico in 1986. Thirty-two contestants competed for the national title, which was won by Conni Carranza from Sonora, who later competed in Miss Universe 1986. Carranza was crowned by outgoing Señorita México titleholder Yolanda de la Cruz . María Luz Velasco from Baja California won second place, giving her the right to represent the country in Miss World 1986. Martha Cristiana Merino won Miss Dorian Grey Award and so she also won the right to represent the country in Miss International 1986 The event was hosted by Rebecca de Alba and Raúl Velasco, Señorita México 1986 was broadcast live on Televisa.

Placements

Special awards

Contestants

1986 beauty pageants
1986 in Mexico
Beauty pageants in Mexico